Hyena butter is a secretion from the anal gland of hyenas used to mark territory and to identify individuals by odor.  The gooey substance is spread onto objects within the territory of the hyena by rubbing their posterior against the object they mark.

Folk beliefs in some regions of East Africa state that witches would ride hyenas and use a gourd full of hyena butter as fuel for the torches that they carried through the night.

See also 
Deer musk
Dog odor
Territorial marking

References 

Carnivora anatomy
Hyenas
Secretion